The Association of Professional Political Consultants (APPC) is a United Kingdom organisation, established in 1994, that is the self-regulatory body that represents firms engaged in lobbying activities. APPC membership is open to public affairs firms, in-house PA teams, and individuals. Currently more than 80 member firms and in-house practitioners are listed on the APPC's register.

APPC was established by five firms of lobbyists following the 1994 cash-for-questions affair, a political scandal in the United Kingdom.

References

External links
 
 UK Public Affairs Council

1994 establishments in the United Kingdom
Organizations established in 1994
Political advocacy groups in the United Kingdom
Professional Political Consultants